Events from the year 1833 in art.

Events
 January – Honoré Daumier is released from prison after serving a 6-month term for caricaturing King Louis-Philippe of France as Gargantua in La Caricature.

Works

 Karl Bryullov – The Last Day of Pompeii
 Thomas Cole
 Scene from "Manfred"
 The Titan's Goblet
 Hippolyte Delaroche – The Execution of Lady Jane Grey
 William Etty – Britomart Redeems Faire Amoret
 Caspar David Friedrich – Easter Morning
 Hiroshige – The Fifty-three Stations of the Tōkaidō (publication begins)
 Orest Kiprensky – Portrait of Bertel Thorvaldsen
 François Rude – Young Neapolitan Fisherboy Playing with a Tortoise (sculpture)
 Sir Martin Archer Shee – William IV
 Matthew Cotes Wyatt – Bashaw, The Faithful Friend of Man Trampling under Foot his most Insidious Enemy (coloured marble)

Births
 April 17 – George Vicat Cole, English painter (died 1893)
 May 3 – Philip Hermogenes Calderon, French-born painter (died 1898)
 May 22 – Félix Bracquemond, French painter and etcher (died 1914)
 August 22 – Odoardo Borrani, Italian painter associated with the Macchiaioli (died 1905)
 August 28 – Edward Burne-Jones, English pre-Raphaelite painter and designer (died 1898)
 November 12 – George Paul Chalmers, Scottish painter (killed 1878)
 Rosalie Sjöman, Swedish photographer (died 1919)

Deaths
 January 30 – Augustin Dupré, French engraver of French currency and medals (born 1748)
 April 3 (March 22 O.S.) – Stepan Pimenov, Russian sculptor (born 1784)
 April 7 – Jacques Réattu, French painter and winner of the grand prix de Rome (born 1760)
 April 8 – Raffaello Sanzio Morghen, Italian engraver (born 1758)
 May – Philippe Auguste Hennequin, French painter (born 1763)
 June 28 – Gustaf Wilhelm Finnberg, Finnish painter (born 1784)
 July 5 – Nicéphore Niépce, French inventor who created some of the earliest photographs (born 1765)
 July 6 – Pierre-Narcisse Guérin, French painter (born 1774)
 July 11 – Paul Joseph Gabriël, Dutch painter and sculptor (born 1784)
 October 11 – Ernst Fries, German painter (born 1801)
 November 27 – Philip Reinagle, English animal, landscape and botanical painter (born 1749)
 December 3 – Adam Buck, Irish-born neo-classical portraitist and miniature painter (born 1759)
 date unknown – Antoine Jean-Baptiste Thomas, French painter and lithographer (born 1791)

References

 
Years of the 19th century in art
1830s in art